Gimpo FC, formerly Gimpo Citizen FC, is a South Korean football club based in the city of Gimpo. Since 2022, they are playing in the K League 2, the second tier of football in South Korea.

History

Gimpo Citizen FC (2013–2020) 

The club was founded as Gimpo Citizen FC in 2013. Between 2015 and 2019, they advanced to the K3 League play-offs for five consecutive seasons, but never made it to the finals.

Gimpo FC (2021–present) 
In order to meet the standards for incorporation of the newly reorganized K3 League, the Gimpo FC foundation was established, and the team was also renamed as Gimpo FC in January 2021. The club participated in the semi-professional K3 League until 2021. In their final K3 League season, Gimpo FC finished as runners-up in the regular season, and won the play-offs after defeating Cheonan City 3–2 on aggregate in the final, clinching their first K3 League trophy.

After the 2021 season, the club became professional and got an approval to become a member of the professional K League 2 from the 2022 season onwards.

Current squad

Season-by-season record

Honours
 K3 League
 Winners: 2021'''

References

External links
Official website 

Gimpo FC
K League 2 clubs
K3 League (2007–2019) clubs
Sport in Gyeonggi Province
2013 establishments in South Korea
Association football clubs established in 2013